Anthidium auritum is a species of bee in the family Megachilidae, the leaf-cutter, carder, or mason bees.

Synonyms
Synonyms for this species include:
Anthidium fischeri Spinola, 1838
Anthidium rufomaculatum Friese, 1899

References

auritum
Insects described in 1832
Taxa named by Johann Christoph Friedrich Klug